Puntian may refer to:
An inhabitant of the Land of Punt
An inhabitant of Puntland
An administrative division in Quezon